Jane Hayward was a British actress.

Hayward made appearances in over twenty films and television programmes. She had roles in productions such as 2001: A Space Odyssey (film), BBC police procedural drama The Bill, Never the Twain, and Executive Stress.

Career 
In the 1970s, Jane Hayward focused her career mostly on the stage. Her roles included A Midsummer Night's Dream at the Ipswich Theatre, the title role in Cinderella at the Northampton Theatre Royal, and Jane Eyre, the stage adaptation of Dial M for Murder, and The Woman in White, also at the Northampton Theatre Royal.

Hayward returned to the acting profession in 2011 after taking a break to raise her family.

Death 
She died after being hit by an Arriva Shires & Essex double-decker bus in Rickmansworth, Hertfordshire in June 2019. BBC News reported in November 2019 that Hayward attempted to "cross the road without looking. At the time of the accident, BBC News reported that Hayward died at the scene.

Filmography

External links
 Official Website

References 

20th-century English actresses
Actresses from London
English stage actresses
English television actresses
2019 deaths
1950 births